Matthew Temitayo Shokunbi is a Nigerian Neurosurgeon and Professor of Anatomy.

He got his MBBS degree at the University of Ibadan shortly after completing his A levels after which he started a residency program in Neurosurgery in Ontario, Canada.
He is a lecturer in Anatomy at the University of Ibadan, and in Neurological surgery at the University College Hospital, Ibadan where he also doubles as a Honorary Consultant  Neurosurgeon.

References

Living people
Nigerian neurosurgeons
University of Ibadan alumni
Academic staff of the University of Ibadan
Year of birth missing (living people)